The 1996 Hanes 500 was the 26th stock car race of the 1996 NASCAR Winston Cup Series and the 48th iteration of the event. The race was held on Sunday, September 22, 1996, in Martinsville, Virginia at Martinsville Speedway, a  permanent oval-shaped short track. The race took the scheduled 500 laps to complete. In a one-lap shootout to the finish, Hendrick Motorsports driver Jeff Gordon would manage to defend the field to take his 18th career NASCAR Winston Cup Series victory and his ninth victory of the season. To fill out the top three, Hendrick Motorsports driver Terry Labonte and Petty Enterprises driver Bobby Hamilton would finish second and third, respectively.

Background 

Martinsville Speedway is an NASCAR-owned stock car racing track located in Henry County, in Ridgeway, Virginia, just to the south of Martinsville. At 0.526 miles (0.847 km) in length, it is the shortest track in the NASCAR Cup Series. The track was also one of the first paved oval tracks in NASCAR, being built in 1947 by H. Clay Earles. It is also the only remaining race track that has been on the NASCAR circuit from its beginning in 1948.

Entry list 

 (R) denotes rookie driver.

Qualifying 
Qualifying was split into two rounds. The first round was held on Friday, September 20, at 3:00 PM EST. Each driver would have one lap to set a time. During the first round, the top 25 drivers in the round would be guaranteed a starting spot in the race. If a driver was not able to guarantee a spot in the first round, they had the option to scrub their time from the first round and try and run a faster lap time in a second round qualifying run, held on Saturday, September 21, at 12:30 PM EST. As with the first round, each driver would have one lap to set a time. For this specific race, positions 26-32 would be decided on time, and depending on who needed it, a select amount of positions were given to cars who had not otherwise qualified but were high enough in owner's points.

Six drivers would fail to qualify: Derrike Cope, Brett Bodine, Chad Little, Ward Burton, Billy Standridge, and Gary Bradberry.

Full qualifying results

Race results

References 

1996 NASCAR Winston Cup Series
NASCAR races at Martinsville Speedway
September 1996 sports events in the United States
1996 in sports in Virginia